Roman Oleksandrovych Adamenko (born 20 July 1992) is a professional Ukrainian footballer who plays as a centre-back.

References

External links
 
 

1992 births
Living people
Footballers from Kyiv
Ukrainian First League players
Ukrainian Second League players
FC Dynamo Kyiv players
FC Dynamo-2 Kyiv players
FC Hirnyk-Sport Horishni Plavni players
MFC Mykolaiv players
FC Arsenal Kyiv players
FC Krystal Kherson players
FC Helios Kharkiv players
FC Myr Hornostayivka players
FC Nyva Vinnytsia players
FC Polissya Zhytomyr players
FC Alians Lypova Dolyna players
Association football defenders
Ukrainian footballers